Maha Chesadabodindranusorn Bridge is an extradosed bridge in area of Mueang Nonthaburi District in Nonthaburi Province, Thailand, over the Chao Phraya River. The bridge is the first extradosed bridge in Thailand. It is located between Phra Nangklao Bridge (upstream) and Rama V Bridge (downstream), connects Nonthaburi 1 Road, on the east side of the river, and Bang Si Mueang - Wat Bot Don Phrom Road and Ratchaphruek Road, on the west side of the river. The bridge was named after King Nangklao, one of whose titles before his accession to the throne was "Chesadabodin".

Construction began in May 2012, after having been delayed for two years, and took around thirty months. It is a part of the completed main road linking network developed by the Department of Rural Roads (DRR) in the area on the west side of the river, to ease the traffic on Rama V Bridge, Phra Nangklao Bridge and Rama IV Bridge.

Gallery

References 

Extradosed bridges
Extradosed bridges in Thailand
Bridges in Thailand
Crossings of the Chao Phraya River